Paul Dubois (18 July 1829 – 23 May 1905) was a French sculptor and painter from Nogent-sur-Seine. His works were mainly sculptures and statues, and he was also a portrait painter.

Early life
Paul Dubois was born on the 18 July 1829 in Nogent-sur-Seine, France. He began studying law to please his father who practiced as a notary, but gave this up in order to train as a sculptor; his enthusiasm for this possibly fanned by the admiration he had for the work of his great-uncle Jean-Baptiste Pigalle. When making his debut at the Paris Salon in 1857 he did so under the name Dubois-Pigalle.

Career
In 1858 he entered the atelier of Armand Toussaint at the École Nationale des Beaux-Arts. The following year he travelled to Rome, studying and copying the many great sculptures and mixed with the likes of Henri Chapu, Alexandre Falguière and Georges Bizet. As an artist he did not have to struggle with financial problems as his family supported all his studies. He stayed in Rome for 4 years and whilst in Rome he executed the works Saint Jean-Baptiste and Narcisse and, in 1863, was awarded "une médaille de 2° classe" by the Paris Salon for work sent to Paris from Rome. When he returned to France he completed the study of a young troubadour, Chanteur florentin du XVe siècle, a work which was to bring him such popular success.

In 1865 and 1876, he was awarded a médaille d'honneur at the Salon des beaux-arts. In June 1867 he was named Chevalier (Knight) of the Légion d'honneur; in July 1874 he was named Officer of the Légion d'honneur; in July 1886 he was promoted to Commander of the Légion d'honneur; and in 1889 he was decorated with the Grand Croix (Grand Cross) of the Légion d'honneur.

His success was not limited to sculpture and as a painter he was in much demand for portraits and after 1870 he gave as much time and effort to his painting as to his sculpture. He also taught at the Académie Julian.  Dubois died from pneumonia in 1905.

Main works

Le musée Camille Claudel (ex Dubois-Boucher)

This museum was established by Dubois and Alfred Boucher and holds information relating to Dubois.

Gallery of images

References

External links

Insecula (French language): index to pages on Dubois' works
 

1829 births
1905 deaths
Place of birth missing
Place of death missing
Academic staff of the Académie Julian
Burials at Père Lachaise Cemetery
Honorary Members of the Royal Academy